Saint Sebastian is a 1570-72 painting of Saint Sebastian by Titian, now in the Hermitage Museum in Saint Petersburg.

History 
Titian painted Saint Sebastian around 1576. It was acquired by the Hermitage Museum from the Barbarigo Gallery in Venice in 1850.

See also 

 Averoldi Polyptych

References 

Religious paintings by Titian
Titian
1570s paintings
Paintings in the collection of the Hermitage Museum
Torture in art